HD 58425, also known as HR 2830, is an astrometric binary (100% chance) located in the northern circumpolar constellation Camelopardalis. It is faintly visible to the naked eye as an orang point of light at an apparent magnitude of 5.64. Based on parallax measurements from Gaia DR3, the system is estimated to be 470 light years away from Earth. HD 58425 is listed as 54 Ursae Majoris in Johann Hevelius' catalogue, but this was dropped after the official IAU's official constellation borders were drawn.

The visible component is an evolved, RGB star with a stellar classification of K2 III. It has 1.74 times the mass of the Sun and is said to be 3.55 billion years old. HD 58425 A has an iron abundance only 38% that of the Sun's, making it metal deficient.

References

Astrometric binaries
K-type giants
Camelopardalis (constellation)
BD+68 00480
058425
036528
2830